Zoé Alejandro Robledo Aburto (born 9 January 1979) is a Mexican politician member of the National Regeneration Movement. He was serving as a Undersecretary of Government since December 2018, but on May 22, 2019 was named director of the Mexican Social Security Institute, after the resignation of Germán Martínez Cázares.

On June 7, 2020, it was reported that Robledo Aburto had been infected by the coronavirus.

References

External links
 Legislative profile

1979 births
Living people
Politicians from Chiapas
Party of the Democratic Revolution politicians
Members of the Senate of the Republic (Mexico) for Chiapas
21st-century Mexican politicians
People from Tuxtla Gutiérrez
Instituto Tecnológico Autónomo de México alumni
National Autonomous University of Mexico alumni
Members of the Congress of Chiapas
Deputies of the LXIV Legislature of Mexico
Senators of the LXII and LXIII Legislatures of Mexico
Members of the Chamber of Deputies (Mexico) for Chiapas